Henry Cowles is the name of:
Henry B. Cowles (1798–1873), U.S. Representative from New York
Henry Cowles (theologian) (1803–1881), American theological scholar
Henry Chandler Cowles (1869–1939), American botanist and ecological pioneer

See also
Henry Cowell (disambiguation)